The Drâslea (also: Drislea) is a right tributary of the river Jijia in Romania. It flows into the Jijia near Trușești.

References

Rivers of Romania
Rivers of Botoșani County